Samson Ramadhani Nyonyi (born 25 December 1982 in Singida) is a Tanzanian marathon runner. He was the gold medalist at the 2006 Commonwealth Games that took place in Melbourne, Australia with the result at 2:11:29.

In 2003 he participated three marathons: He won the Beppu Oita Marathon, was fifth at the London Marathon (time 2:08:01, still his personal best) and was 15th at the World Championships in Paris.

He finished 40th at the 2004 Olympic Games, and 5th at the 2005 World Championships.

In 2007 he won the Lake Biwa Marathon and competed at the 2007 World Championships in Osaka finishing 25th. At the 2008 Olympic marathon he finished 55th, and 66th at the 2012 Men's marathon.

Achievements

External links

sports-reference
Marathoninfo

1982 births
Living people
People from Singida Region
Tanzanian male marathon runners
Athletes (track and field) at the 2004 Summer Olympics
Athletes (track and field) at the 2008 Summer Olympics
Athletes (track and field) at the 2012 Summer Olympics
Olympic athletes of Tanzania
Athletes (track and field) at the 2006 Commonwealth Games
Athletes (track and field) at the 2010 Commonwealth Games
Commonwealth Games gold medallists for Tanzania
Commonwealth Games medallists in athletics
Medallists at the 2006 Commonwealth Games